Tobie McGann (born 4 August 1982) is a female rugby union player. She represented  from 2006 to 2010. She was a member of the squad to the 2006, and 2010 Rugby World Cup that finished in third place.

In 2007, McGann was named in a 22-player squad that toured New Zealand in October. She was part of the 2009 Rugby World Cup Sevens champion team.

References

1984 births
Living people
Australia women's international rugby union players
Australian female rugby union players
Australian female rugby sevens players
Australia international rugby sevens players
20th-century Australian women
21st-century Australian women